Indian Summer is a posthumous Mick Ronson soundtrack album for a film that was never made. It contained previously unreleased material, most of it recorded around 1981. Many of the tracks were instrumentals. The track "Indian Summer" was considered for Heaven and Hull.

Track listing 
 "Indian Summer (Opening Title)"
 "Tinker Street"
 "Satellite 1"
 "(Interlude) Get on With It"
 "Ballad of Jack Daniels"
 "Blue Velvet Skirt" 	
 "Midnight Love" 	
 "Satellite 1" 	
 "Blue Velvet Skirt (Reprise)" 	
 "Plane to England" 	
 "China" 	
 "I'd Give Anything to See You (Closing Title)"

Mick Ronson albums
Compilation albums published posthumously
2001 compilation albums